Events in the year 1177 in Norway.

Incumbents
Monarch: Magnus V Erlingsson

Events
.

Arts and literature

Births

Deaths
Eystein Meyla, king pretender.

References

Norway